is an underground metro station located in Naka-ku, Yokohama, Kanagawa, Japan operated by the Yokohama Municipal Subway’s Blue Line (Line 1). It is 18.1 kilometers from the terminus of the Blue Line at Shōnandai Station.

History
Bandōbashi Station was opened on December 16, 1972. Platform screen doors were installed in September 2007.

Lines
Yokohama Municipal Subway
Blue Line

Station layout
Bandōbashi Station is an underground station with a single island platform serving two tracks.

Platforms

References
 Harris, Ken and Clarke, Jackie. Jane's World Railways 2008-2009. Jane's Information Group (2008).

External links
 Bandōbashi Station (Blue Line) 

Naka-ku, Yokohama
Railway stations in Kanagawa Prefecture
Railway stations in Japan opened in 1972
Blue Line (Yokohama)